The Northcote-Trevelyan Report was a document prepared by Stafford H. Northcote (later to be Chancellor of the Exchequer) and C.E. Trevelyan (then Permanent Secretary at the Treasury) about the British Civil Service. Commissioned in 1853 and published in February 1854, the report catalysed the development of Her Majesty's Civil Service in the United Kingdom. Influenced by the Chinese Imperial Examinations, it recommended that entry to the Civil Service be solely on merit, to be enforced through the use of examinations. Its formal title was "Report on the Organisation of the Permanent Civil Service, Together with a Letter from the Rev. B. Jowett."

The report is generally regarded as the founding document of the British Civil Service, enshrining the service with the "core values of integrity, propriety, objectivity and appointment on merit, able to transfer its loyalty and expertise from one elected government to the next". Recognising that, at the time, public administration was suffering “both in internal efficiency and in public estimation", it formed the basis for the principle of an impartial Civil Service.

References

External links
Full text of the Northcote-Trevelyan Report

Civil Service (United Kingdom)
Reports of the United Kingdom government
Imperial examination